Bernard Lancret (4 September 1912 – 5 September 1983) was a French film actor. He appeared in over thirty films between 1935 and 1956 in a mixture of leading and supporting roles. He played the composer Franz Schubert in the 1940 film Sérénade. He played the painter Julien Breughel in the 1935 film Carnival in Flanders.

Selected filmography
 The Queen and the Cardinal (1935)
 Carnival in Flanders (1935)
 Valse royale (1936)
 The Two Girls (1936)
 The Flame (1936)
 Ménilmontant (1936)
 The Secret of Polichinelle (1936)
 The Drunkard (1937)
 The Citadel of Silence (1937)
 Maman Colibri (1938)
 The Chess Player (1938)
 Ultimatum (1938)
 Le héros de la Marne (1938)
 Immediate Call (1939)
 Latin Quarter (1939)
 Entente cordiale (1939)
 Serenade (1940)
 Twisted Mistress (1942)
 Pierre and Jean (1943)
 Le Corbeau (1943)
 Not So Stupid (1946)
 Hyménée (1947)
 The Story of Dr. Louise (1947)
 Julietta (1953)

References

Bibliography
 Grossvogel, David I. Marianne and the Puritan: Transformations of the Couple in French and American Films. Lexington Books, 2005.
 Jung, Uli & Schatzberg, Walter. Beyond Caligari: The Films of Robert Wiene. Berghahn Books, 1999.

External links

1912 births
1983 deaths
French male film actors
20th-century French male actors